Firas Hatoum (Or Feras Hatoum, Arabic: فراس حاطوم) is a Lebanese journalist currently working for New TV (a Lebanon-based satellite channel), who came into the spotlight for his coverage of the Israeli war in Lebanon in July 2006, and then his following up as a key witness in the assassination of former PM Rafik Hariri, Muhammad Zuhair Al-Siddiq and was held in custody after breaking and entering Al-Siddiq's home during an investigative mission. 

He is a third-place winner of a 2007 Les Lauréats du Inquirer Award for his research into prison conditions.

References

Lebanese journalists
Living people
Year of birth missing (living people)